Theeyadur  is a village in the  
Avadaiyarkoilrevenue block of Pudukkottai district, Tamil Nadu, India.

Demographics 

As per the 2001 census, Theeyadur had a total population of 947 with 466 males and 481 females. Out of the total population 655 people were literate.

References

Villages in Pudukkottai district